The 1946 UC Santa Barbara Gauchos football team represented Santa Barbara College during the 1946 college football season.

Santa Barbara competed in the California Collegiate Athletic Association (CCAA). This was the first year of competition for Santa Barbara after a five-year hiatus for World War II. The team was led by second-year head coach Stan Williamson and played home games at La Playa Stadium in Santa Barbara, California. The Gauchos finished the season with a record of two wins and six losses (2–6, 1–4 CCAA).

Schedule

Notes

References

Santa Barbara
UC Santa Barbara Gauchos football seasons
Santa Barbara Gauchos football